Redhouse may refer to:

Places
 Redhouse, County Kilkenny, Ireland
 Redhouse, Eastern Cape, South Africa
 Redhouse Yacht Club
 Redhouse, Maryland, United States
 Redhouse, Sunderland, England
 Redhouse Castle, in East Lothian, Scotland
 Redhouse Cymru, an arts centre in Merthyr Tydfil, Wales

Other uses
 Redhouse (surname), including a list of people with the name
 Redhouse (band), 1970s Australian rock band

See also

 Red House (disambiguation)
 Maison Rouge (disambiguation)